Mailon Rivera is a New York City native and actor. With starring roles in films such as Midnight Blue and Skin Deep and guest appearances on over 35 top rated television shows, he is also known for his role as Nation of Islam leader, Min. Xavier Salaam on the Golden Globe and Emmy Award winning drama series The Shield, and Omar K. Bone in the UPN comedy series Second Time Around.

He is the creator and primary director of the “Native Dance Actors Series”, an advanced actors scene study produced through the guidance of Robi Reed.

His work has won multiple awards including the Lincoln Filmmaker Trophy for "Best Film" at the American Black Film Festival, Telluride International, NYC Independent Film Festival, Chicago International and the Film Society at the Lincoln Center to name but a few. His starring role in the psychological thriller "Skin Deep" has become a top requested DVD video rental. 

Mailon appears in the film is “Bull Run”, a compelling drama written and directed by Indie director and producer, Joe Rasullo.

Mailon is the subject of a book titled “A Random Life: From Homeless to…?” which deals with his experiences as a foster child and homeless teen in NYC's Times Square. This book is currently being written with J.M. Morris.

External links

Year of birth missing (living people)
Living people
African-American male actors